"DC" is the ninth and penultimate episode of the second season of the HBO satirical comedy-drama television series Succession, and the 19th overall. It was written by series showrunner Jesse Armstrong and directed by Mark Mylod, and aired on October 6, 2019.

In the episode, the Roys are compelled to testify in Washington, D.C. before the Senate regarding allegations of sexual misconduct on their company's cruise ships, bringing a subplot that began early in the first season to the forefront.

Plot
At Logan's apartment, the Roys watch a televised interview with James Weissel, the whistleblower in the Brightstar Cruises sexual misconduct scandal. Weissel names the late Lester McClintock (AKA "Mo-Lester") personally responsible for most of the misconduct, but implicates Gerri, Tom and Kendall in helping cover it up. The interview also discusses the company's "No Real Person Involved" (NRPI) cases, in which the victims were sex workers or migrant workers at foreign ports, which the company used to clear itself of any legal liability. The family learns from Shiv that the Senate wants senior company officials (including Logan) to testify at a hearing pertaining to the scandal. On his father's request, Roman agrees to help the company survive financially by securing funding from Eduard Asgarov's family. Rhea arrives shortly thereafter to aid in preparations for the testimony, and privately relays to Logan that she feels manipulated at being named CEO right as the company is weathering a major scandal.

The Roys plan to use Bill Lockheart, Tom's predecessor who initially oversaw the cruises cover-up, as a scapegoat, but are surprised to find him in the Senate building when they arrive. Bill subtly suggests that he is there to ensure his own survival of the scandal. Logan, Kendall and the others strategize from within a boardroom, while Tom is the first to be called to testify alongside Gerri. Tom thoroughly flubs his responses to Senator Gil Eavis' aggressive questioning, at one point even claiming not to know who Greg is. He returns from his testimony in a panic, accusing Shiv and the others of using him as their "patsy."

Meanwhile, Roman travels with Karl and Laird to consult Eduard's help. He and Eduard half-heartedly continue their duties as owners of the Heart of Midlothian football club, and Eduard invites Roman and the others to Turkey to make their investment proposal to Eduard's father. In Turkey, as Roman is in the middle of a sales pitch, he and the others are ushered into a hotel lobby by anti-corruption militia forces, whom Eduard says were sent by the Turkish president's son-in-law, Zeynal, to seize key assets. The militia hold the hotel occupants hostage while Roman manages to secure something of an agreement with Eduard and his associates. He is later taken to meet with Zeynal face-to-face.

Shiv meets with Gil and Nate privately, where she learns that they have a witness who is ready to testify against the Roys. Logan sends Shiv and Rhea to meet with the witness while he and Kendall take the stand. Logan also stumbles through his responses to Eavis' questions, but deflects the blame onto Kendall, who nonetheless provides a strong and confident rebuke to Eavis and accuses him of operating on personal bias against Logan and his company.

Shiv and Rhea track down Kira, the witness, to a playground where she is with her children. Rhea is uncomfortable coercing a sexual assault victim into silence, so Shiv meets with the woman alone. Shiv candidly tells Kira that she and the company cannot be trusted, but asks her whether her personal courage in coming out as a witness against the Roys is worth the lifetime of public scrutiny that will follow her if she chooses to go through with her statement. She offers Kira a hefty settlement as well as a promise that she will work to ensure that those involved in the crimes will see justice. Kira agrees to back down, and Shiv wins the approval of her father for helping them win the case.

After the trial, Rhea, feeling blindsided by the scandal, tells Logan she no longer wants to be associated with the company, and abdicates her CEO title before walking away. Logan watches Kendall's testimony with Shiv and worries that his son's combative stance against Congress will hurt Waystar's relationship with its shareholders. He tells Shiv that if they really want the company to survive, they will need to make a "blood sacrifice".

Production
"DC" was written by Succession showrunner Jesse Armstrong and directed by Mark Mylod in his seventh episode for the series. For the scenes in Congress, the production crew built a replica of a Senate chamber at a studio in Queens. To prepare for his scenes during Tom's testimony, actor Matthew Macfadyen watched the House testimony of Michael Cohen, former attorney to President Donald Trump, and his questioning by Rep. Elijah Cummings.

Reception

Ratings
Upon airing, the episode was watched by 0.705 million viewers, with an 18-49 rating of 0.15.

Critical reception
"DC" was critically acclaimed, with reviewers praising the writing, performances, and culmination of the cruises storyline that had begun in the first season. On Rotten Tomatoes, the episode has a rating of 100% based on 15 reviews, with the critics' consensus stating, "Disturbingly daunting, and thoroughly engrossing, The Roy family pulls out all the stops as they prevent Congress from destroying their company in 'D.C.'"

Randall Colburn of The A.V. Club gave the episode an A-, praising the comedy of Tom's testimony and Matthew Macfadyen's performance as "genuinely distressing". Colburn also praised the major scene involving Shiv's meeting with the sexual assault victim, as well as Brian Cox's "brutal, incredible delivery" during the final scene with Rhea. Scott Tobias of Vulture gave the episode a full five stars, praising the "brilliant" writing of the scenes where the Roys assess the extent of the damage done to them by the scandal, and compared the meeting between Shiv and Kira to the real-life case of Christine Blasey Ford and her sexual assault allegations against then-nominee to the Supreme Court Brett Kavanaugh. Tobias also praised how the "darker, more serious tone" of the episode helped underscore the fundamentally "rotten" quality of the Roys. Noel Murray of The New York Times praised the episode as "gripping, but also illuminating" in the way it explored how the wealthy come up with various machinations to avoid accountability. Vox called "DC" a "terrific" episode, praising writer Jesse Armstrong for drawing humor from "cringe-inducing" moments. The review considered the episode to be one in which "absolutely everybody loses, and on Succession that's a truly delicious proposition."

References

External links
 "DC" at HBO
 

2019 American television episodes
Succession (TV series)